The monument to Pope John Paul II is installed outside the Mexico City Metropolitan Cathedral, in the historic center of Mexico City, Mexico.

References

External links

 

Cultural depictions of Pope John Paul II
Historic center of Mexico City
Monuments and memorials in Mexico City
Outdoor sculptures in Mexico City
Sculptures of men in Mexico
Statues in Mexico City